Diadenis Luna Castellano (born September 11, 1975) is a Cuban judoka. At the 1996 Summer Olympics she won the bronze medal in the women's Half Heavyweight (66–72 kg) category, together with Ylenia Scapin.

References

External links
 

1975 births
Living people
Judoka at the 1996 Summer Olympics
Judoka at the 1995 Pan American Games
Judoka at the 1999 Pan American Games
Olympic judoka of Cuba
Olympic bronze medalists for Cuba
Olympic medalists in judo
Medalists at the 1996 Summer Olympics
Cuban female judoka
Pan American Games gold medalists for Cuba
Pan American Games medalists in judo
Medalists at the 1999 Pan American Games
20th-century Cuban women
21st-century Cuban women